The City University of New York School of Law (CUNY School of Law) is a public law school in New York City. It was founded in 1983 as part of the City University of New York. CUNY School of Law was established as a public interest law school with a curriculum focused on integrating clinical teaching methods within traditional legal studies.

75% of the Class of 2019 obtained full-time, long-term, JD-required employment within nine months after graduation.

Academics

Curriculum and clinical programs
CUNY Law is currently ranked #1 nationally (tied) for its clinical education program. The Law School curriculum combines traditional substantive law courses (like contracts, torts, civil procedure and criminal law) with lawyering skills throughout the three years of legal education. The first year curriculum consists of seven required substantive courses, Legal Research, and a four-credit Lawyering Seminar in each semester where students work on legal writing and other lawyering skills through simulations and other role-playing devices. Each third-year student is required to participate in a clinic or concentration for one or two semesters (12 to 16 credits).

Under the umbrella of Main Street Legal Services, Inc., several clinics provide direct service, in-house, supervised live-client representation. The two concentrations are highly supervised external placements.

Creating Law Enforcement Accountability & Responsibility (CLEAR)
Community & Economic Development Clinic
Defenders Clinic
Economic Justice Project
Disability & Aging Justice Clinic (formerly Elder Law)
Equality & Justice Practice Clinic (née Concentration)
Family Law Practice Clinic (née Concentration)
Health & Environmental Justice Practice Clinic (née Concentration)
Immigrant and Non-Citizen Rights Clinic
Human Rights & Gender Justice Clinic
Mediation Clinic
Workers Rights Clinic

Justice initiatives and special programs
In addition to numerous pro bono opportunities available through student organizations and the Career Planning Office, the Law School supports a number of justice initiatives that serve citizen and non-citizen workers and assist and empower historically underserved communities. These include the Community Legal Resource Network (CLRN), the Center on Latinx Rights and Equality (CLRE), the Center for Urban Environmental Reform (CUER), and the Economic Justice Project (EJP). The Contemplative Lawyering Program offers yoga and meditation.

The Haywood Burns Chair in Civil Rights brings prominent visiting civil rights figures to the Law School in memory of its second dean, a national civil rights scholar and activist.

Community Legal Resource Network (CLRN): Begun in 1998, CLRN is the Law School's initiative for alumni's continued work on to promote justice. There are 3 primary initiatives: 1) Launchpad for Justice Fellowship, supporting recent graduates in developing their skills and job readiness though collaborations with Court-based and community-based legal programs in underserved communities. 2) City Counseling Program where experienced alumni provide free legal consultations via legislative offices to constituents on housing, immigration, small business etc. 3) CUNY LawWorks, a low-cost, co-working space for alumni as they set up solo or small-group practices or non-profit organizations devoted to serving pressing needs of the poor and disadvantaged in communities.
Center on Latinx Rights and Equality (CLRE): Focuses on issues impacting the Latino community in the United States, with the goal of developing progressive strategies for legal reform. The Center educates lawyers, law students, scholars and the general public and advocates for expanded civil rights in the areas that affect the growing Latinx population.
Center for Urban Environmental Reform (CUER): Founded on the belief that environmental justice is a critical aspect of social justice and that communities are entitled to participate fully and meaningfully in environmental decisions that affect them.
Economic Justice Project (EJP): Launched in 1997 in response to regressive welfare policies adopted by the City of New York. CUNY law students advocate for policy change at the state and local level along with the Welfare Rights Initiative and other community organizations.

Rankings and reputation
U.S. News & World Report, the provider of the "tiered" list of law schools in the country, in 2021 ranked CUNY #102 of 144 American Bar Association approved law schools, with CUNY's part-time law program ranked #22 in the country.

The school has also been recognized by National Jurist/PreLaw Magazine as the top 10 public interest law school and by the Princeton Review for having the best professors, one of the most diverse law faculties in the nation, the most welcoming campus in the nation for older students, and the most liberal student body.

Publications
City University of New York Law Review A student-run publication devoted to producing public interest scholarship, engaging with the public interest bar, and fostering student excellence in writing, legal analysis, and research. It is published twice-yearly. Issues have included a Symposium issue on Justice Ruth Bader Ginsburg, a special issue devoted to student scholarship, a special volume on Elder Law featuring winning articles from the ABA Law and Aging Student Competition, and a forthcoming Symposium issue on the work of Ruthann Robson.

History
In 1981, CUNY hired Charles Halpern to be the founding dean of a planned law school. Halpern is regarded within the legal community as the "father of public interest law" with a professional career as a Georgetown law professor and co-founder of the Center for Law and Social Policy, an organization based in Washington D.C. that advocates for policies that aim to improve the lives of low-income people.

In spring 1982, Halpern hired Howard Lesnick as a distinguished professor of law. Lesnick believed the law only has significance in relation to the underlying human problems that it addresses.

Student life

Diversity
CUNY Law's students are approximately 54% percent BIPOC as are 50% of faculty and staff. More than 28% are LGBTQTIA. Almost 32% are first generation college students. More than 68% of the faculty and staff are self-identified females.

CUNY School of Law in 2008 established the Center for Diversity in the Legal Profession which conducts original research and serves as a clearinghouse for data on the participation of people of color in the law.

Campus
Originally the CUNY School of Law at Queens College was located in Flushing, Queens. In 2012, CUNY Law moved to 2 Court Square in Long Island City giving the school nearly 70,000 additional square feet of space. This location is within walking distance of seven subway lines (two within one stop of Manhattan), the Long Island Railroad, and eight bus lines. It is only a few blocks away from the Long Island City Courthouse. The move enabled CUNY School of Law to develop a new part-time program, which started in 2015. The building at 2 Court Square is LEED Gold certified, which means that its construction had a reduced environmental impact and its design increases occupants' health and well-being.

Notable people

Deans
 Charles Halpern, founder of the D.C.-based Center for Law and Social Policy, a Georgetown law professor, was the first Dean of CUNY Law.
 W. Haywood Burns served from 1987 until 1994
 Kristin Booth Glen, stepped down after being elected to the Manhattan Surrogate's Court. 
 Michelle Anderson served between 2006 and 2016
 Mary Lu Bilek served from 2016 until 2021 when she stepped down following a controversial comment she made during a faculty meeting
 Eduardo R.C. Capulong served as interim Dean from March 2021 to June 2022.
 Sudha Setty was appointed Dean in 2022, becoming the first person of South Asian descent to lead a CUNY college.

Alumni
 Jamaal Bailey, 2012, New York State Senator (D) 36th Senate District
 Catalina Cruz, 2009, New York State Assembly Member, (D) 39th Assembly District.  
 Brian F. Curran, 1994, New York State Assembly Member (R) 14th Assembly District.
 Jeffrey D. Klein, 1993, New York State Senator (D) 34th Senate District
 Michael Montesano, 1989 New York State Assembly (R) 15th District
 Daniel J. O'Donnell, 1987, New York State Assembly Member (D) 69th Assembly District, Sponsor of the Marriage Equality Act.
 Rebecca Seawright, 1992, New York State Assembly Member (D) 76th Assembly District.
 Marina Sitrin, professor and activist
 Iyanla Vanzant, 1988, life coach on NBC's Starting Over.

Employment 
According to CUNY School of Law's official 2019 ABA-required disclosures, 75% of the Class of 2019 obtained full-time, long-term, JD-required employment nine months after graduation. CUNY School of Law's Law School Transparency under-employment score is 11.3%, indicating the percentage of the Class of 2019 unemployed, pursuing an additional degree, or working in a non-professional, short-term, or part-time job nine months after graduation.

References

External links 

 
1983 establishments in New York City
Law schools in New York City
Universities and colleges in Queens, New York
Long Island City
Educational institutions established in 1983
Universities and colleges on Long Island
Law
Universities and colleges in New York City